Antonio Rafael Armas Machado (born July 2, 1953) is a Venezuelan former professional baseball player. He played in Major League Baseball (MLB) as an outfielder from 1976 to 1989. He is the father of pitcher Tony Armas Jr. and the older brother of outfielder Marcos Armas.

Armas Sr. was one of the top power hitters in the American League in the early 1980s. Twice he led the American League in home runs, and topped all of Major League Baseball in runs batted in during the  season. He was, however, prone to injuries that affected his career. In his major league career, Armas went to the disabled list twelve times, missing 302 games.

Career

Pittsburgh Pirates
Armas debuted with the Pittsburgh Pirates' Gulf Coast League affiliate in  just shy of his eighteenth birthday. He appeared in four games for the Pirates, and collected two hits in six at-bats.

Oakland A's
Armas was the opening day right fielder for the A's in 1977, though by the end of the season, he was starting in center and saw most of his action there. For , Armas became a full-time right fielder, and finally played a full season, batting .279 with 35 home runs and 109 runs batted in in 158 games.

In the strike shortened  season, Armas tied for the league lead in home runs (22) and games played (109) to be named the American League Player of the Year by The Sporting News. In  he set a pair of major league records with eleven putouts and twelve total chances in right field in a single game against the Toronto Blue Jays. Following the season he was traded, along with Jeff Newman, to the Boston Red Sox for Carney Lansford, Garry Hancock and minor leaguer Jerry King.

Boston Red Sox
In Boston, Armas became the center fielder, sharing the outfield with Jim Rice (LF) and Dwight Evans (RF). Although he was booed by fans for his low batting average (.218), he placed second in the AL with 36 home runs and seventh with 107 RBI.

Armas had a monster , batting .268 and leading the AL with 43 home runs, 123 RBI, 77 extra-base hits, and 339 total bases. He was named to The Sporting News and UPI postseason AL All-Star teams, was Boston's co-MVP, and placed seventh in AL MVP balloting.

His next two seasons were ruined by recurring leg injuries and Boston's acquisition of Dave Henderson. Armas was released after batting just once in the 1986 World Series. In the following years, he became a valuable role player for the Angels, and he retired after the  season.

Twice he finished in the top ten in AL Most Valuable Player award balloting (4th, 1981; 7th, 1984).

California Angels
Armas was signed as a free agent by the California Angels In July 1987, and played 3 seasons with them (1987-1989) to finish out his Major League career. For his career playing in 1,432 games over 14 seasons, Armas tallied 251 home runs, 614 runs, 204 doubles, 39 triples, 815 RBI, and 1,302 hits.

Family ties
Tony is one of 13 children, His younger brother, outfielder Marcos Armas, had a brief stint with the Athletics in the 1993 season, while his son Tony Jr. pitched from 1999 through 2008 for the Montreal Expos/Washington Nationals, Pittsburgh Pirates and New York Mets.

Coaching career
Armas is the current Batting coach for the Leones del Caracas a team in the Venezuelan Professional Baseball League.

His playing career in Venezuela was a stellar one. He started playing with the Leones and later joined the Caribes de Oriente. His 97 career home runs were the Venezuelan professional baseball record, before another center fielder—Robert Pérez "the black wall" of Cardenales de Lara—set a new mark in 2007. In addition, Armas is fourth in the all-time list of RBI leaders, with 412.

In 2005, he earned induction into the Venezuelan Baseball Hall of Fame and Museum with 96% of the vote. He also was selected to the Caribbean Baseball Hall of Fame in 1998.

See also
List of second-generation Major League Baseball players
List of Major League Baseball career home run leaders
List of Major League Baseball annual runs batted in leaders
List of Major League Baseball annual home run leaders
List of Major League Baseball players from Venezuela

References

External links
, or Tony Armas - Baseballbiography.com
The ESPN Baseball Encyclopedia – Gary Gillette, Peter Gammons, Pete Palmer. Publisher: Sterling Publishing, 2005. Format: Paperback, 1824pp. Language: English. 

1953 births
Living people
American League All-Stars
American League home run champions
American League RBI champions
Boston Red Sox players
California Angels players
Caribes de Oriente players
Charleston Charlies players
Edmonton Trappers players
Gastonia Pirates players
Gulf Coast Pirates players
Leones del Caracas players
Llaneros de Portuguesa players
Major League Baseball center fielders
Major League Baseball players from Venezuela
Major League Baseball right fielders
Monroe Pirates players
Oakland Athletics players
People from Anzoátegui
Pittsburgh Pirates players
Sherbrooke Pirates players
Silver Slugger Award winners
Thetford Mines Pirates players
Venezuela national baseball team people
Venezuelan baseball coaches
Venezuelan expatriate baseball players in Canada
Venezuelan expatriate baseball players in the United States